Zachary Orr (born June 9, 1992) is an American football coach and former linebacker who is the inside linebackers coach for the Baltimore Ravens of the National Football League (NFL). He previously served as an assistant coach for the Baltimore Ravens from 2017 to 2020 and outside linebackers coach for the Jacksonville Jaguars in 2021.

Orr played college football at  North Texas and signed with the Baltimore Ravens as an undrafted free agent in 2014. He played for three seasons in the NFL.

Playing career

Baltimore Ravens
Orr was signed by the Baltimore Ravens as an undrafted free agent in 2014. He made the 53-man roster as an undrafted rookie and finished second on the team with 7 special teams tackles.

Orr began the 2016 season as the Ravens starting weak-side linebacker, and sealed a win over the Jacksonville Jaguars in Week 3 with an interception in the waning seconds. He started all 15 games he played in, recording 132 tackles, five passes defended, three interceptions, and a forced fumble. He was placed on injured reserve on December 30, 2016, prior to the season finale. He was named second-team All-Pro after the 2016 season.

Orr announced his retirement from the NFL on January 20, 2017 due to a congenital neck/spine condition that ended his season. On June 28, 2017, Orr announced on Good Morning Football that he would be coming out of retirement and return to football after receiving encouraging diagnoses about the congenital spinal condition. Orr was set to be a restricted free agent in 2017, but the Ravens never placed a tender on him since they assumed he would retire, therefore making Orr an unrestricted free agent.

After visiting with six teams and talking with 11 others, no team would sign him due to his spinal condition and herniated disc. He officially announced his retirement for a second time on August 18, 2017.

Coaching career

Baltimore Ravens
On January 31, 2017, Orr began his coaching career and was hired by the Baltimore Ravens as a defensive analyst under head coach John Harbaugh. This came 11 days after announcing his second retirement.

Jacksonville Jaguars
On February 11, 2021, Orr was hired by the Jacksonville Jaguars as their outside linebackers coach under head coach Urban Meyer.

Baltimore Ravens (second stint)
On February 23, 2022, Orr was hired by the Baltimore Ravens as their inside linebackers coach under head coach John Harbaugh.

Personal life
Orr is the son of former Washington Redskins tight end Terry Orr. He has three brothers, all of whom have played college football: older brother Terrance, who played at Texas State, younger brother Nick, who played at TCU (and is currently a free agent) and youngest brother Chris, who currently plays for the New Jersey Generals of the United States Football League (USFL).

Orr was born with a rare spinal condition where his C-1 vertebrae, the one located at the top of his neck below his skull, was not fully developed. It was revealed that if Orr took a bad hit, the C-1 could explode and may result in death. This promptly forced Orr to retire from professional football after his third season, coming off a breakout season where he led the Ravens in tackles and earned second-team All-Pro in 2016.

References

External links
Baltimore Ravens bio
North Texas Mean Green bio

1992 births
Living people
People from DeSoto, Texas
Players of American football from Texas
American football linebackers
North Texas Mean Green football players
Baltimore Ravens players
Players of American football from Virginia
People from Loudoun County, Virginia
Baltimore Ravens coaches
Jacksonville Jaguars coaches
African-American coaches of American football
African-American players of American football
21st-century African-American sportspeople